Lautoconus is a subgenus  of sea snails, marine gastropod mollusks in the genus Conus, family Conidae, the cone snails and their allies.

In the latest classification of the family Conidae by Puillandre N., Duda T.F., Meyer C., Olivera B.M. & Bouchet P. (2015), Lautoconus has become a subgenus of Conus as Conus (Lautoconus) Monterosato, 1923(type species: Conus mediterraneus Hwass in Bruguière, 1792) represented as Conus Linnaeus, 1758

Distinguishing characteristics
The Tucker & Tenorio 2009 taxonomy distinguishes Lautoconus from Conus in the following ways:

 Genus Conus sensu stricto Linnaeus, 1758
 Shell characters (living and fossil species)
The basic shell shape is conical to elongated conical, has a deep anal notch on the shoulder, a smooth periostracum and a small operculum. The shoulder of the shell is usually nodulose and the protoconch is usually multispiral. Markings often include the presence of tents except for black or white color variants, with the absence of spiral lines of minute tents and textile bars.
Radular tooth (not known for fossil species)
The radula has an elongated anterior section with serrations and a large exposed terminating cusp, a non-obvious waist, blade is either small or absent and has a short barb, and lacks a basal spur.
Geographical distribution
These species are found in the Indo-Pacific region.
Feeding habits
These species eat other gastropods including cones.

 Subgenus Lautoconus Monterosato, 1923
Shell characters (living and fossil species)
The shell is turgid in shape with convex sides.  The protoconch is paucispiral.  The whorl tops are ornamented with cords that reach the middle spire whorls and often persist.  The anal notch is shallow to moderate in depth.  The periostracum is smooth and thin, and the operculum is of moderate size.
Radular tooth (not known for fossil species)
The anterior section of the radular tooth is equal to shorter than the posterior section, and blade is long and covers most of the anterior section.  A basal spur is present, and the barb is short.  The radular tooth has serrations in one or two rows.
Geographical distribution
The species in this genus occur in the occur in the West African and Mediterranean regions..
Feeding habits
These cone snails are vermivorous, meaning that the cones prey on polychaete worms.

Species list
This list of species is based on the information in the World Register of Marine Species (WoRMS) list. Species within the genus Lautoconus include:
 Lautoconus aemulus Reeve, 1844: synonym of Conus (Lautoconus) aemulus Reeve, 1844, represented as Conus aemulus Reeve, 1844
 Lautoconus africanus Kiener, 1848: synonym of Conus (Lautoconus) africanus Kiener, 1848, represented as Conus africanus Kiener, 1848
 Lautoconus albuquerquei Trovão, 1978: synonym of Conus (Lautoconus) albuquerquei Trovão, 1978, represented as Conus albuquerquei Trovão, 1978
 Lautoconus alexandrinus Kaicher, 1977: synonym of Conus (Lautoconus) alexandrinus Kaicher, 1977, represented as Conus alexandrinus Kaicher, 1977
 Lautoconus belairensis (Pin & Leung Tack in Pin, 1989) : synonym of  Conus belairensis Pin & Leung Tack in Pin, 1989
 Lautoconus bruguieri (Kiener, 1848) : synonym of  Conus bruguieri Kiener, 1848
 Lautoconus cacao (Ferrario, 1983) : synonym of  Conus cacao Ferrario, 1983
 Lautoconus cloveri (Walls, 1978) : synonym of  Conus cloveri Walls, 1978
 Lautoconus desidiosus (A. Adams, 1853): synonym of Conus desidiosus A. Adams, 1853
 Lautoconus dorotheae (Monnier & Limpalaër, 2010): synonym of Conus (Lautoconus) dorotheae Monnier & Limpalaër, 2010 represented as Conus dorotheae Monnier & Limpalaër, 2010
 Lautoconus echinophilus (Petuch, 1975) : synonym of  Conus echinophilus (Petuch, 1975)
 Lautoconus guanche (Lauer, 1993) : synonym of  Conus guanche Lauer, 1993
 Lautoconus guinaicus (Hwass in Bruguière, 1792) : synonym of  Conus guinaicus Hwass in Bruguière, 1792
 Lautoconus hybridus (Kiener, 1845) : synonym of  Conus hybridus Kiener, 1845
 Lautoconus mediterraneus (Hwass in Bruguière, 1792): synonym of Conus ventricosus Gmelin, 1791
 Lautoconus mercator (Linnaeus, 1758) : synonym of  Conus mercator Linnaeus, 1758
 Lautoconus pineaui (Pin & Leung Tack, 1989) : synonym of  Conus pineaui Pin & Leung Tack, 1989
 Lautoconus tacomae (Boyer & Pelorce, 2009) : synonym of  Conus tacomae Boyer & Pelorce, 2009
 Lautoconus taslei (Kiener, 1850) : synonym of  Conus taslei Kiener, 1850
 Lautoconus trencarti (Nolf & Verstraeten, 2008) : synonym of  Conus trencarti Nolf & Verstraeten, 2008
 Lautoconus unifasciatus (Kiener, 1850) : synonym of  Conus unifasciatus Kiener, 1850
 Lautoconus vayssierei (Pallary, 1906) : synonym of  Conus vayssierei Pallary, 1906
 Lautoconus ventricosus (Gmelin, 1791) : synonym of  Conus ventricosus Gmelin, 1791

References

Further reading 
 Kohn A. A. (1992). Chronological Taxonomy of Conus, 1758-1840". Smithsonian Institution Press, Washington and London.
 Monteiro A. (ed.) (2007). The Cone Collector 1: 1-28.
 Berschauer D. (2010). Technology and the Fall of the Mono-Generic Family The Cone Collector 15: pp. 51-54
 Puillandre N., Meyer C.P., Bouchet P., and Olivera B.M. (2011), Genetic divergence and geographical variation in the deep-water Conus orbignyi complex (Mollusca: Conoidea)'', Zoologica Scripta 40(4) 350-363.

External links
 To World Register of Marine Species
  Gastropods.com: Conidae setting forth the genera recognized therein.

Conidae
Gastropod subgenera